A currency symbol or currency sign is a graphic symbol used to denote a currency unit. Usually it is defined by a monetary authority, such as the national central bank for the currency concerned.

Symbols are neither defined nor listed by international standard ISO 4217, which only assigns three-letter codes.

Usage
When writing currency amounts, the location of the symbol varies by language.

Design

Older currency symbols have evolved slowly, often from previous currencies.

Newly invented currencies and currencies adopting new symbols have symbolism meaningful to their adopter.

There are other considerations, such as how the symbol is rendered on computers and typesetting. For a new symbol to be used, its glyphs needs to be added to computer fonts and keyboard mappings already in widespread use, and keyboard layouts need to be altered or shortcuts added to type the new symbol. For example, the European Commission was criticized for not considering how the euro sign would need to be customized to work in different fonts. The original design was also exceptionally wide. These two factors have led to most type foundries designing customized versions that match the 'look and feel' of the font to which it is to be added, often with reduced width.

List of currency symbols currently in use

Rupee symbols by language

List of historic currency symbols
Some of these symbols may not display correctly.

See also

 List of currencies
 List of circulating currencies
 Currency Symbols (Unicode block)
 International currency symbol

References